Akiyo (written: 明代, 啓代 or 聡生) is a feminine Japanese given name. Notable people with the name include:

, Tokyo councilwoman who died under mysterious circumstances
, Japanese mixed martial artist and kickboxer
, Japanese rock climber

Japanese feminine given names